Donald Oramasionwu (born June 4, 1986) is a professional Canadian football defensive lineman. Oramasionwu was drafted in the fifth round (39th overall) of the 2008 CFL Draft by the Winnipeg Blue Bombers. He attended training camp with the team but returned to the University of Manitoba for his senior year, becoming a Canada West all-star.

On February 20, 2009, Oramasionwu signed with the Blue Bombers and played for three seasons with the team. He was signed as a free agent on February 15, 2012 by the Edmonton Eskimos. He signed with the Montreal Alouettes in February 2017. He was signed by the Ottawa Redblacks on October 9, 2018.

References

External links
Ottawa Redblacks bio

1986 births
Living people
Canadian football defensive linemen
Edmonton Elks players
Montreal Alouettes players
Manitoba Bisons football players
Ottawa Redblacks players
Players of Canadian football from Manitoba
Canadian football people from Winnipeg
Winnipeg Blue Bombers players